Lencinas is a surname. Notable people with the surname include:

Carlos Washington Lencinas (1888–1929), Argentine politician, son of José
José Néstor Lencinas (1859–1920), Argentine politician
Leandro Lencinas (born 1995), Argentine footballer

See also
Lencina